Rounin is a 2007 Philippine television drama romantic science fiction series produced and aired by ABS-CBN. It is a fantasy and martial arts series shown in Philippine TV and is said to be one of the most expensive locally produced TV series aired in the Philippines. It is also the first Filipino (and the first Southeast Asian) series shot using high-definition video technology. The series is line produced by Reality Films while Larger Than Life Productions is handling post, visual effects, VFX supervision, mastering and grading. The series is shot using Panasonic’s HDP2 technology. The series ended after one season due to failure to do well in the ratings game. It aired from April 16 to July 26, 2007, with a total of 67 episodes.

It features an ensemble cast including Luis Manzano, Angelica Panganiban, Rafael Rosell, Jhong Hilario, Nikki Gil, Shaina Magdayao, Rayver Cruz, Joross Gamboa, Melissa Ricks, Geoff Eigenmann, Aaron Junatas, Agot Isidro, Ina Raymundo, Monsour del Rosario, Aubrey Miles and Diether Ocampo.

Synopsis
Rounin is the story of an elite group of warriors who live in a place called Lumeria. It also happens to take place on a totally different planet.

The Rounin(s) are tasked to protect the city and its inhabitants against the threats of Helion, the City of Death. Each Rounin specializes in a martial arts discipline, and is commanded by the master Rounin, the leader of Lumeria. While battling their enemies, the Rounin strive to adhere to their tenets - one that they cannot fall in love with each other.

The show centers around the quest of a young Rounin warrior, Mythos, as he tries to piece together his past to unlock his true identity.

Cast and characters

Main Characters
The main cast and characters of the series are enumerated below.

Other Characters

 Rico Barrera as Amon
 TJ Trinidad as Xander
 Jeni Hernandez as Armana 
 Mhyco Aquino as Lore
 Paw Diaz as Solana
 Janice Hung as Zelian
 Emilio Garcia as Pharus
 Juddha Paolo as Tyro
 Ronnie Lazaro as Mang Elli
 Owen Bowen as Young Creon 
 Jairus Aquino as Young Mythos
 Sharlene San Pedro as Young Selene
 Bea Nicolas

Reception

Production 
Rounin's story actually began in November 2005, when writer Philip King and creative manager Rondel Lindayag pitched the idea of the heroic "Rounin of Lumeria" to ABS-CBN executives. So unique and impressive was this idea, then known as project Mythos, it took them one and a half years to complete it. Searching for good location took them months until they finally found a 44-hectare abandoned cement factory in Binangonan, Rizal, and took two months to complete the cities of Helion, Lumeria, Vesta, Argos and Icarra. All of the cast went under three months of training martial arts, capoeira, muay thai, judo, kali, arnis and wushu.

Soundtrack
The original soundtrack was released by Star Records which include ten tracks including the theme song entitled "Argos" which was composed and interpreted by the band, Bamboo. Other tracks include the love theme for the series, entitled "Iniibig Kita" sung by Kitchie Nadal and "Tanging Ikaw" performed by Shamrock.

Also in the Rounin OST include 2006 Rockista grand prize grand winner, Bojo who sings “Walang Hangganan," Acel Bisa (former vocalist of Moonstar88) sings “Sa Ngalan ng Pag-Ibig,” Rock icon Kevin Roy, of Razorback performs “Kailanpaman,”  and the superband, Sandwich sings “Humanda Ka” plus up and coming rock bands Bliss, Side Crash and North Groove performing “I Think Of You,”  “One Last Time” and “Nasaan Ka Na,” respectively.

Premiere 
On April 14, 2007, ABS-CBN aired a TV special entitled "The Making of Rounin: Ang Bagong Mitolohiya", a documentary on how Rounin was made and conceptualized. It was hosted by  Anne Curtis and Luis Manzano.

Broadcast time

As a result of low ratings, Rounin was bumped off to late-night timeslots after only two weeks on primetime.

April 16 – 27 (Episodes 1-10): Monday-Friday 8:30-9:15 p.m.
April 30 – June 7 (Episodes 11-40): Monday-Thursday 10:00-10:45 p.m., Friday 9:15-10:00 p.m.
June 11 – July 26 (Episodes 41-68): Monday-Thursday 10:45-11:30 p.m.

References

External links

ABS-CBN drama series
Fantaserye and telefantasya
2007 Philippine television series debuts
2007 Philippine television series endings
Philippine action television series
Philippine science fiction television series
Martial arts television series
Filipino-language television shows
Television shows filmed in the Philippines